Lieutenant General George Edward Stratemeyer (24 November 1890 – 9 August 1969) was a senior commander in the United States Air Force. He held senior command appointments in the China Burma India Theater of World War II and was Far East Air Forces commander during the first year of the Korean War.

Early career

Stratemeyer was born in Cincinnati, Ohio, in 1890. He graduated from the United States Military Academy in June 1915 ("the class the stars fell on") as a second lieutenant of Infantry. He served with the 7th and 34th Infantry regiments in Texas and Arizona until September 1916 when he was detailed to the Aviation Section, U.S. Signal Corps, for flying training at Rockwell Field, San Diego, California. Stratemeyer became a first lieutenant in June 1916. He became commanding officer of the United States Army Air Service Flying and Technical Schools at Kelly Field, Texas in May 1917. He became a captain in August 1917, assigned as school commandant of the School of Military Aeronautics Division ground school at Ohio State University, and later commanding officer of Chanute Field, Illinois. Stratemeyer was promoted to major in August 1918. With official transfer to the Air Corps from the Infantry in 1920 he went to Luke Field, Hawaii as commanding officer of the 10th Air Park.

Stratemeyer returned to West Point in August 1924 as instructor in tactics. He graduated from the Air Corps Tactical School at Langley Field, Virginia, in June 1930 and from the Command and General Staff School at Fort Leavenworth, Kansas, in 1932. He remained at Leavenworth as an instructor for the next four years. Stratemeyer was promoted to lieutenant colonel in June 1936 and assigned to command the 7th Bomb Group at Hamilton Field, California. He graduated from the Army War College in 1939 and went to the office of the Chief of the United States Army Air Corps as head of the Training and Operations Division, with promotion to colonel in March 1940.

A year later Stratemeyer became executive officer to General Henry H. Arnold, the chief of the Air Corps, and in August he was promoted to brigadier general. Stratemeyer commanded the Southeast Air Corps Training Center at Maxwell Field, Alabama, for five months and returned to Washington in June 1942 as chief of Air Staff for General Arnold. He had been promoted to major general in February 1942.

World War II
Stratemeyer went to the China Burma India Theater in mid-1943, appointed Commanding General of the Army Air Forces' India-Burma Sector, deputy Air Commander Southeast Asia, and commander of the Eastern Air Command, South East Asia Command (SEAC). Although officially air advisor to General Joseph Stilwell, his status was comparable to that of Stilwell.

Part of Stratemeyer's command, the Tenth Air Force, had been integrated with the RAF Third Tactical Air Force in India in December 1943 and was operating under Lord Louis Mountbatten, Supreme Allied Commander of SEAC. Another part of it, the Fourteenth Air Force in China, was under the jurisdiction of Generalissimo Chiang Kai-shek as commander of the China Theater. And although the India-China Wing, Air Transport Command received its allocations of tonnage requirements for the Hump airlift from Stratemeyer as Stilwell's deputy, control of ICWATC resided with Headquarters ATC, in Washington. One of Stratemeyer's favorite cartoons showed him sitting at his desk surrounded by pictures of his eight bosses (Stilwell, Mountbatten, General George C. Marshall, Chiang, Arnold, Royal Air Force Air Marshal Sir Richard Peirse, Major General Daniel I. Sultan, and FDR), all of whom could give him orders in one or another of his capacities.

Stratemeyer was promoted to lieutenant general in May 1945 and from April 1944 until March 1946 was commander of the Army Air Forces in the China Theater with headquarters at Chungking. Stratemeyer was a major figure in the retaliatory maneuvering after Stilwell's recall to force General Claire Chennault out as commander of the 14th Air Force, headquartered in Kunming.

After the war, Stratemeyer commanded the Air Defense Command at Mitchel Field, New York, and the Continental Air Command, which was organized there in November 1948. At both positions, Stratemeyer tried to improve America's warning system.

Korean War
Stratemeyer went to Tokyo in April 1949 as commanding general of Far East Air Forces, which he led through the first year of the Korean War. His units responded rapidly to the North Koreans' invasion of the South and provided South Korea and General Douglas MacArthur with the vital air arm. General Stratemeyer had a serious heart attack in Tokyo in May 1951 and was confined to the Air Force hospital at nearby Tachikawa Air Base.

Stratemeyer retired on 31 January 1952. He died in Winter Park, Florida on 9 August 1969.

Decorations
Stratemeyer awards include the Distinguished Service Cross, Distinguished Service Medal with three oak leaf clusters; Distinguished Flying Cross; Air Medal with oak leaf cluster; American Defense Service Medal; Asiatic-Pacific Campaign Medal with five service stars; European-African-Middle Eastern Campaign Medal with service star; World War I Victory Medal; World War II Victory Medal; American Campaign Medal with service star; National Defense Service Medal; Korean Service Medal with four service stars; Mexican Border Service Medal; Ho-Tu Medal of Chinese Air Force; Tashou Cloud Banner (Chinese); British Companion of the Order of the Bath Chinese Special; Chinese Pilot's Badge; Polish Order of Polonia Restituta Commander's Cross; Knight Commander of the Order of the British Empire; Yugoslavian pilot's badge.

References

 This article includes content from Official United States Air Force Biography of George E. Stratemeyer, which as a work of the U.S. Government is presumed to be a public domain resource.

External links
Website about George E. Stratemeyer

1890 births
1969 deaths
Military personnel from Cincinnati
Air Corps Tactical School alumni
United States Air Force personnel of the Korean War
United States Army personnel of World War II
Commanders of the Order of Polonia Restituta
Graduates of the United States Military Academy Class of 1915
Honorary Companions of the Order of the Bath
Honorary Knights Commander of the Order of the British Empire
Recipients of the Air Medal
Recipients of the Distinguished Flying Cross (United States)
Recipients of the Distinguished Service Cross (United States)
Recipients of the Distinguished Service Medal (US Army)
United States Air Force generals
United States Army Air Forces generals
United States Army Air Service pilots of World War I
United States Army officers
United States Army Air Forces generals of World War II
United States Army personnel of World War I